Tatjana Maria defeated Laura Pigossi in the final, 6–3, 4–6, 6–2 to win the singles tennis title at the 2022 Copa Colsanitas. It was her second WTA Tour singles title, her first since 2018, and made her the first mother-of-two WTA Tour title holder in the 21st century. Ranked as the world No. 237, Maria also became the lowest-ranked player to win a WTA Tour title since Margarita Gasparyan in 2018. This was the first WTA Tour final contested between two qualifiers since the 2021 Lyon Open, and the first WTA Tour final contested by players ranked outside the top 200 since the inception of the computer rankings.

Camila Osorio was the defending champion, but lost in the semifinals to Pigossi.

Seeds

Draw

Finals

Top half

Bottom half

Qualifying

Seeds

Qualifiers

Qualifying draw

First qualifier

Second qualifier

Third qualifier

Fourth qualifier

Fifth qualifier

Sixth qualifier

References

External links
Main draw
Qualifying draw

Copa Colsanitas - Singles
2022 Singles